Wodajo is a male given name of Ethiopian origin that may refer to:

Kifle Wodajo (1936–2004), Ethiopian politician and former Minister of Foreign Affairs
Wodajo Bulti (born 1957), Ethiopian long-distance runner

Ethiopian given names
African masculine given names
Amharic-language names